Anolis loveridgei, Loveridge's anole, is a species of lizard in the family Dactyloidae. The species is found in Honduras.

References

Anoles
Reptiles described in 1936
Endemic fauna of Honduras
Reptiles of Honduras
Taxa named by Karl Patterson Schmidt